Jana Špotáková (née Mezeiová) (born 10 September 1985) is a Slovak sports shooter.

References

1985 births
Living people
Slovak female sport shooters
Olympic shooters of Slovakia
Shooters at the 2020 Summer Olympics
Sportspeople from Bratislava